The 1982 San Diego State Aztecs football team represented San Diego State University during the 1982 NCAA Division I-A football season as a member of the Western Athletic Conference (WAC).

The team was led by head coach Doug Scovil, in his second year, and played home games at Jack Murphy Stadium in San Diego, California. They finished with a record of seven wins and five losses (7–5, 4–3 WAC).

Schedule

Team players in the NFL
The following were selected in the 1983 NFL Draft.

The following finished their college career in 1982, were not drafted, but played in the NFL.

Team awards

Notes

References

San Diego State
San Diego State Aztecs football seasons
San Diego State Aztecs football